Bukkene Bruse (established in 1988 in Norway) is a Norwegian traditional folk music band, presenting a varied repertoire of traditional and folk-style Norwegian songs, but also including many new compositions based on various Norwegian musical traditions.

Biography 

The members of the group include Annbjørg Lien, a prominent Hardanger fiddle and nyckelharpa (keyed fiddle) player; Arve Moen Bergset, fiddle player and vocalist; flutist Steinar Ofsdal; and pipe organist Bjørn Ole Rasch. The name of the group is taken from the fairy tale of the Three Billy Goats Gruff.

The group was formed in 1988 in Norway and has travelled and performed widely in Scandinavia, and elsewhere. In 1994, they were selected as official Olympic Musicians for the Lillehammer Winter Olympic Games and performed at the closing ceremony.

Band members 
 Arve Moen Bergset - vocals, violin, and hardingfele
 Annbjørg Lien - Hardingfele & nyckelharpa
 Steinar Ofsdal - flute, low whistle
 Bjørn Ole Rasch - pipe organ

Albums
Bukkene Bruse (1993)
Åre (1995)
Steinstolen (1998)
Den Fagraste Rosa (2001)
Spel (2004)

References

External links 
Bukkene Bruse on Bjørn Ole Rasch Official Website

Norwegian folk musical groups
Spellemannprisen winners
Musical groups established in 1988
1988 establishments in Norway
Grappa Music artists
Heilo Music artists

Musical groups from Norway with local place of origin missing